Nicolas Saint-Jean is a flair bartender. Saint-Jean is the creator of the Flair Head-to-Head concept, and a founder of the flair bartending school Flair Motion.

External links
 Roadhouse Flair Competition
 Flair Motion 
 Nicolas Saint-Jean, Rock & Rita's Profile

Living people
Bartenders
Year of birth missing (living people)
Place of birth missing (living people)